Shebang may refer to:

Arts and entertainment
 The Shebang, an Australian radio show
 She-Bang, a character from the cartoon Static Shock
 Shebang, a mid 1960s dance show hosted by Casey Kasem

Other uses
 shebang (Unix), the #! syntax used in computer programs to indicate an interpreter for execution

See also
 "She Bangs", a song performed by Ricky Martin
 The Whole Shebang (disambiguation)